Diva house or handbag house is an anthemic subgenre of house music that became most popular in gay clubs during the second half of the 1990s. The Encyclopedia of Contemporary British Culture defines handbag house as having "prominent female vocals, breakdowns, and a proliferation of piano 'stabs'." Modern diva house compositions use synth stabs and four on the floor rhythms.

Background
The term "diva house" was in use as early as July 1992, when Billboard magazine described "What Are We Doin'" by Dee Dee Simone as "iron-lunged diva-house". It is known for booming unisex vocals, sometimes sampled from other recordings. Such samples come from soul, disco, gospel recordings and even show tunes performed by singers like Bette Midler, Judy Garland, Liza Minnelli, and other gay icons. This bombastic genre can include songs performed by dance specialists as well as club remixes of pop songs by singers such as Patti LaBelle, Aretha Franklin, Mariah Carey, and Whitney Houston.

The term "handbag house" appears to be particularly popular on British dancefloors and refers to the notion of a group of female club-goers dancing around a pile of their handbags. Dance culture's usage of the word 'handbag house' started life as a derogatory term.

In the 1990s, as gay clubs and gay culture became more mainstream so did house music. The accessibility of diva house lead to the mainstreaming of gay club music. In the UK especially, handbag house became emblematic of the clubbing culture. According to music historians Bill Brewster and Frank Broughton, by the mid-1990s handbag house had helped to make clubbing into a "mainstream leisure activity." With the mainstreaming of gay culture in the 1990s, "diva" was the word that bound house music to the gay dance scene, which was previously only defined by Italo disco compositions.

Music critic Simon Reynolds asserts that handbag house was "initially a disparaging term, coined by condescending cognoscenti vis-à-vis the anthemic, chart-penetrating house tunes that allegedly appealed to women, and above all to the folk-mythic construct of Sharon and Tracy." According to electronic music producer Ewan Pearson and academic Jeremy Gilbert, "handbag house" is often derided as "plastic disco" by dance music fans who prefer "the more esoteric sound of musics which eschew the 'mainstream' musical priorities of melody and verbal language." The mainstream appeal of handbag house caused underground dance music purists to flock to the spin-off genres of hardbag, progressive house, deep house, and garage house. Sociologist Dunja Brill argues that criticism of handbag house carries a "misogynist slant in club cultural representations of the denigrated mainstream of 'Handbag House' against which Ravers define their subculture." Brill maintains that bias against handbag house "is expressed most clearly in a femininisation of the denigrated 'mainstream' of pop culture against which subcultures define themselves."

See also
 Camp (style)
 Diva
 Gay anthem
 Gay club
 Gay icons

References

20th-century music genres
LGBT-related music
House music genres